The Philippine House Committee on Higher and Technical Education, or House Higher and Technical Education Committee is a standing committee of the Philippine House of Representatives.

Jurisdiction 
As prescribed by House Rules, the committee's jurisdiction includes the following:
 Centers of excellence
 Distance education
 Post-secondary and tertiary education
 Students' and teachers' welfare
 Technical education

Members, 18th Congress

See also
 House of Representatives of the Philippines
 List of Philippine House of Representatives committees
 Commission on Higher Education
 Technical Education and Skills Development Authority

References

External links 
House of Representatives of the Philippines

Higher
Higher education in the Philippines